Johan Casimir Ehrnrooth (Kazimir Gustavovich Ernrot; 26 November 1833 – 5 February 1913) was a Finnish statesman in the service of Imperial Russia, who also acted as Prime Minister of Bulgaria.

Biography
In 1856, he graduated from the Imperial Military Academy in Saint Petersburg and enlisted in the Imperial Russian Army.

Ehrnrooth first came to prominence when he played a leading role in suppressing the resistance of Imam Shamil and the Caucasian Avars in 1859. At the time a Major in the Russian Army, Ehrnrooth continued to rise through the ranks in campaigns against Polish rebels and fighting to remove the Ottoman Turks from Bulgaria. Following the Independence of Bulgaria Ehrnrooth was chosen by Russia to look after the interests of Alexander of Bulgaria, becoming Minister of War on 17 April 1880. Ehrnrooth became the strongman of the government, and became Prime Minister on 9 May 1881 whilst Alexander finalised his plans to assume full control of the country. Ehrnrooth became the strongest supporter of Alexander during this period, although he was forced to leave Bulgaria when the experiment floundered.

After his return to Russia Ehrnrooth became Minister-Secretary of State for Finnish Affairs, although the job, which involved drives towards Russification, did not suit the Finn. He retired in the 1890s and died of a stroke in Helsinki at the age of 79. Although he had no children both Finnish World War II colonel and later general Adolf Ehrnrooth and former chairman of Nokia and Kymmene Corporation Casimir Ehrnrooth are from his family line.

External links

Biography of Ehrnrooth

Further reading 
 

1833 births
1913 deaths
People from Nastola
People from Häme Province (Grand Duchy of Finland)
Swedish-speaking Finns
19th-century Finnish nobility
Finnish generals
Prime Ministers of Bulgaria
Imperial Russian Army generals
Russian people of the January Uprising
Finnish expatriates in Bulgaria
Finnish people from the Russian Empire
Defence ministers of Bulgaria
20th-century Finnish nobility
Johan Casimir